This is a list of films released in Pakistan in 2009 (see 2009 in film).

2009

See also
2009 in Pakistan

References

Movie : Kafira (2011) Language : Punjabi Releasing : Eid-ul-Azha Starcast : Sajjad Ahmed Warriach, Legendary Shahid Hameed, Shafqat Cheema and Akram Udasm Sobiyah
Director : Saleem Murad Written by Saleem Murad Producer : Dr. Sajjad Ahmad Warraich Production : Inqalaab Production
First Punjabi Movie of Pakistan having Visual Effects. Kafra Shot on HD Camera
Assistant Director:Naghman Saleem Kafira is a Liberal Love Story Edited by: Naghman Saleem and Zeeshan Amjad

External links
 Search Pakistani film – IMDB.com

2009
Pakistani
Films